The 1979–80 FA Cup was the 99th season of the world's oldest football knockout competition, The Football Association Challenge Cup, or FA Cup. The final saw second division West Ham United beat holders Arsenal 1–0. As of 2022, this was the last occasion when a club outside the top division of English football won the FA Cup.

First round proper

Teams from the Football League Third and Fourth Division entered in this round plus Stafford Rangers, Kettering Town, Altrincham and Scarborough were given byes.  The first round of games were played on 24 November 1979. Replays were played on 26–28 November.

Second round proper

The second round of games were intended to be played on 15 December 1979, but some matches were not played until 17–19 December and one until 5 January 1980. Replays took place at various dates after these games.

Third round proper
Teams from the Football League First and Second Division entered in this round. The third round of games in the FA Cup were mainly played on 5 January 1980, with some games taking place on 8–9 January and one on 14. Replays were intended for 8–9 January but again took place at various times.

Fourth round proper

The fourth round of games were mainly played on 26 January 1980. Replays were played on 29 and 30 January.

Fifth round proper

The fifth set of games were all played on 16 February 1980. Two replays were played on 19 and 20 February.

Sixth round proper

The sixth round of games were played on 8 March 1980. There were no replays.

Semi finals

Replays

Second replay

Third replay

Final

Television Coverage
The right to show FA Cup games were, as with Football League matches, shared between the BBC and ITV network. All games were shown in a highlights format, except the Final, which was shown live both on BBC1 and ITV. The BBC football highlights programme Match of the Day would show up to three games and the various ITV regional network stations would cover up to one game and show highlights from other games covered elsewhere on the ITV network. No games from Rounds 1 or 2 were shown. Occasional highlights of replays would be shown on either the BBC or ITV.

This was the first season of a 4 year deal between the FA/Football League and BBC/ITV where BBC and ITV would alternate between Saturday nights and Sunday afternoons for highlights. This season it was as it was under the previous contracts from 1964-79 Saturday nights BBC1 and Sunday afternoons ITV.

These matches were.

1Footage available on YouTube

References

External links
 FA Cup Results Archive

 
FA Cup seasons
Fa
Eng